Tarfeh (also Romanized as Ţarfeh; also known as Ţaraf) is a village in Jowzam Rural District, Dehaj District, Shahr-e Babak County, Kerman Province, Iran. At the 2006 census, its population was 25, in seven families.

References 

Populated places in Shahr-e Babak County